Necdet Ünüvar (born 6 June 1960) is a Turkish politician from the Justice and Development Party (AKP), who has served as a Member of Parliament for Adana since 22 July 2007. He is currently the rector of Ankara University.

Biography 
Born in the district of Ceyhan, Adana, he graduated from Atatürk University Faculty of Medicine, becoming a docent and later a professor after taking on various roles in different hospitals. Specialising on illnesses relating to endocrinology and metabolism, he served as the Undersecretary to the Ministry of Health between 2002 and 2007, after which he was elected as an AKP Member of Parliament. He was appointed as the rector of Ankara University on August 14, 2020.

He is married with three children and can speak fluent English.

See also
23rd Parliament of Turkey
24th Parliament of Turkey
25th Parliament of Turkey

References

External links
 MP profile on the Grand National Assembly website
 Collection of all relevant news items at Haberler.com
 Collection of all relevant news items at Milliyet
 Collection of all relevant news items at İhlas News Agency
 Collection of all relevant news items at Son Dakika

Justice and Development Party (Turkey) politicians
Deputies of Adana
Members of the 25th Parliament of Turkey
Living people
People from Adana
1960 births
Members of the 24th Parliament of Turkey
Members of the 23rd Parliament of Turkey
Members of the 26th Parliament of Turkey